Anna Moskwa (born  in Zamość, Poland) is a Polish politician who has been serving as Minister of Climate and Environment under Prime Minister Mateusz Morawiecki in his second cabinet since .  She is the second minister to hold the position, after inaugural minister Michał Kurtyka.  Moskwa has also previously served as Undersecretary of State in the Ministry of Marine Economy and Inland Navigation.

Early life and education 

Moskwa later graduated from Catholic University of Lublin, where she studied sociology, and from Maria Curie-Skłodowska University, where she studied international relations.  She attended the University of Warsaw for postgraduate studies in enterprise management.  She has also earned an MBA from Lazarski University.

Career 

At the time she was chosen to be Minister of Climate and Environment, Moskwa had been serving as an executive at PKN Orlen, a Polish oil refiner, leading the company's offshore wind farm projects.

During the 2022 Russian invasion of Ukraine, Moskwa called for immediate sanctions on Russian oil and gas, and stated that Poland wished to set a clear deadline for the end of European Union imports of Russian oil.  She also stated that the union should penalize parties paying for Russian gas in rubles, and that Poland was ready to help Germany in halting its use of Russian oil.

Personal life 

Anna Moskwa is fluent in English, French, and Spanish.

References

External links 
 Ministerial profile on gov.pl

1979 births
Living people
21st-century Polish women politicians
Government ministers of Poland
John Paul II Catholic University of Lublin alumni
Lazarski University alumni
Maria Curie-Skłodowska University alumni
People from Zamość
University of Warsaw alumni
Women government ministers of Poland